Bingöl emirate (1231-1864) or Suveydi Emirate was an emirate reigning in Bingöl region between 1231 and 1864.

History 

Kurdish historian Sharafkhan Bidlisi wrote that the Emirs of Bingöl came from the Barmakids family and that they ruled Bingöl since the caliphate of the Abbasid caliph Harun al-Rashid.

In the 12th century, after the collapse of the Ayyubid Empire, the Emirate of Bingöl was established, then known under the name of Çapakçur. The Bingöl principality, was a vassal to the Mongols, Aq Qoyunlu and Kara Koyunlu respectively, but it preserved its existence in this turbulent period.
. After defeating the Azerbaijani dominated Tabriz; it organized expeditions to Eastern and Southeastern Anatolia on 1508. The expeditions were directed towards Mosul, Mardin and Diyarbekir. Later the Safavids succeeded in capturing Capakçur, although they also aimed to take over the administrative center of Hançuk. This was prevented by troops of the Bingöl Emir Abdal Bey. The Emir died shortly after the war and his successor was not able to protect Hançuk, and after the Battle of Caldiran in 1514, the Emirs of Bingöl were subject to the Ottoman Empire After the death of Abdal Bey, the lands of the emirate were divided into regions as Genç and Bingöl, which came under the control of Palu Emirate in the early 17th century, was ended by the Ottoman's in 1864.The rulers of the principality were exiled to the city of Harput.

Emir Isfahan bey 
Isfahan Bey is one of the gentlemen of Suveydi, after the death of his father between 1514 and 1549. He reigned for a long time and then left many works as a legacy. Unfortunately, only some of these historical monuments have survived to the present day.

Melik of Bingöl
Information about the emirate of Bingöl is limited between the 13th and 15th centuries.
Emir Shap(the first known leader of the emirate. )
Abdal Bey   (?-1510)(His rule was the height of the emirate.)
Isfahan Bey (1510-1549)(When Isfahan Bey became the emir, Bingöl became a part of the Ottoman Empire .)
II. Suleyman Bey (1835-1864, when he was exiled to Harput by the Ottomans)

References

History of Kurdistan
States and territories established in 1231
States and territories disestablished in 1864
History of Bingöl Province
Vassal states of the Ottoman Empire